Karczunek may refer to the following places:
Karczunek, Chełm County in Lublin Voivodeship (east Poland)
Karczunek, Puławy County in Lublin Voivodeship (east Poland)
Karczunek, Masovian Voivodeship (east-central Poland)
Karczunek, Świętokrzyskie Voivodeship (south-central Poland)